Walter William "Wally" Hilgenberg (September 19, 1942 – September 23, 2008) was a professional American football linebacker, he played 16 seasons in the National Football League (NFL), four with the Detroit Lions and 12 with the Minnesota Vikings.

Early years
Born in Marshalltown, Iowa, Hilgenberg's family moved to Wilton (then known as Wilton Junction) where he grew up and graduated from Wilton High School. He played college football in the Big Ten Conference at the University of Iowa in Iowa City, where he starred on both sides of the line of scrimmage, as a linebacker and as a guard. Two of his nephews, Jay and Joel would play on the offensive line at center in the NFL during the 1980s and 1990s.

NFL career
Hilgenberg was selected in the fourth round of the 1964 NFL Draft (48th overall) by the Lions. In 1968, he was traded from the Lions to the Pittsburgh Steelers, but was waived before ever playing a game in Pittsburgh.

Hilgenberg was picked up off waivers by the Vikings and played for another dozen seasons, though 1979. During that time, he was one of 11 players to appear in all four of the Vikings' Super Bowls (IV, VIII, IX, XI).

Personal
Hilgenberg's daughter Kristi was Miss Minnesota Teen USA 1998. His grandson Luke Lindahl was a linebacker for the Iowa Hawkeyes.

Death
Hilgenberg died at age 66 in 2008, after battling amyotrophic lateral sclerosis or Lou Gehrig's disease  for several years. After his death, brain dissection found advanced chronic traumatic encephalopathy (CTE), which mimics many ALS symptoms.

See also
 Purple People Eaters

References

External links

1942 births
2008 deaths
Deaths from motor neuron disease
Neurological disease deaths in Minnesota
American football linebackers
American football players with chronic traumatic encephalopathy
Iowa Hawkeyes football players
Detroit Lions players
Minnesota Vikings players
Sportspeople from Marshalltown, Iowa
People from Wilton, Iowa